Jean-Yves Duclos  (born 1965) is a Canadian economist and politician who has served as Minister of Health since 2021 under Prime Minister Justin Trudeau. A member of the Liberal Party of Canada, he has been the Member of Parliament (MP) for Québec since 2015.

Early career and education
Duclos attended the University of Alberta, where he earned an undergraduate degree in economics, followed by graduate and doctoral studies in economics at the London School of Economics. His doctoral thesis in 1992 was titled "Progressivity, equity and the take-up of state benefits, with application to the 1985 British tax and benefit system".  Prior to his election to the House of Commons, he headed the economics department at Université Laval and was the president-elect of the Canadian Economics Association. He was elected a Fellow of the Royal Society of Canada in 2014.

Tenure in Parliament
He was elected to represent the riding of Québec in the House of Commons in the 2015 general election as a member of the Liberal Party of Canada. He was the first Liberal elected to represent this riding since Gilles Lamontagne, who left office in 1984. He was appointed to the federal Cabinet, headed by Justin Trudeau, as Minister of Families, Children and Social Development. He was reelected in the 2019 general election and sworn in as President of the Treasury Board. On October 26, 2021, he was appointed Minister of Health.

Electoral record

References

External links
 
Official website
Bio & mandate from the Prime Minister

Living people
Liberal Party of Canada MPs
Members of the House of Commons of Canada from Quebec
Politicians from Quebec City
Alumni of the London School of Economics
University of Alberta alumni
Canadian economists
Academic staff of Université Laval
1965 births
Fellows of the Royal Society of Canada
Members of the King's Privy Council for Canada
Members of the 29th Canadian Ministry